Dolichopezinae is a subfamily of true crane fly. There is only one genus.

Genus
Dolichopeza Curtis, 1825

References

Tipulidae